Radix natalensis is a species of freshwater snail, an aquatic gastropod mollusc in the family Lymnaeidae.

This species occurs widely in Africa. It is a major intermediate host for Fasciola gigantica in Africa. Placement of this species in the genus Radix was confirmed by Correa et al. (2010).

Distribution 
Radix natalensis is a widespread species in Africa, occurring from northern Africa to southern Africa:

 Northern Africa: Algeria, Tunisia, Egypt, Sudan. There are also findings of distribution of Radix natalensis in Algeria 8–10,000 years ago. In Egypt it has been detected in water bodies of the Nile Delta.
 Western Africa: Benin, Burkina Faso, Côte d'Ivoire, Gambia, Ghana, Guinea, Guinea-Bissau, Liberia, Mali, Niger, Nigeria and Senegal,
 Eastern Africa: Burundi, Djibouti, Eritrea, Ethiopia, Kenya, Malawi, Mozambique, Somalia, Tanzania, Uganda, Zambia and Zimbabwe.
 Central Africa: Angola, Cameroon, Central African Republic, Chad, Democratic Republic of the Congo, Republic of the Congo, Equatorial Guinea and Gabon.
 Southern Africa: Botswana, Namibia, South Africa and Rhodesia.
 Madagascar

The type locality is in "pools in Port Natal", which today is Durban, South Africa.

Description 
Radix natalensis was described by the German scientist and traveller Christian Ferdinand Friedrich Krauss in 1848.

The shape of the shell is elongate ovoid. The shell is colorless or light brown in color. The height of the aperture covers about 3/4 of the shell height. The lip of the aperture is thin and sharp. The umbilicus is closed. The width of the shell is about 5.75–7 mm. The height of the shell is 4.6–19.2 mm.

The reproductive system and radula was described by Wright (1963) in detail.

Ecology 
Radix natalensis lives in permanent water bodies. They prefer clear, slow-running water with low salinity and abundant vegetation. An estimated density of Radix natalensis in a natural habitat in Tanzania was 34 snails per m². The snails lived mainly in the shallow water in depths of 0–4 cm, mainly between 20–30 cm from the shoreline.  They prefer plant detritus or bedrock as a substrate.

Laboratory experiments have shown that some larger snails of Radix natalensis can survive on a wooden surface without water for up to 21 days. Some smaller snails of Radix natalensis have survived desiccation on a soil surface up to 60 days on "black" soil. Some smaller snails of Radix natalensis were able to survive for up to 90 days on soil among sedges (Cyperus) or in the "black" soil exposed to sun or in the soil with stones.

Parasites 
This species has been found to be an intermediate host of both Fasciola hepatica and Fasciola gigantica. Overall, rates of snail infection vary between 10% and 40%. The highest infection rate was found to be in summer and this may be a factor responsible for lowering snail density in this season.
Parasites of Radix natalensis include:
 Fasciola hepatica
 Fasciola gigantica
 Trichobilharzia sp.
 some cercaria from Echinostomatidae
 some xiphidiocercaria from Plagiorchiidae
 four trematode larvae in Zambia

Predators of Radix natalensis include leeches Helobdella nilae and Alboglossiphonia conjugata.

Snails of the non-indigenous species Marisa cornuarietis eliminated Radix natalensis and other two native snail species from a small pond in Tanzania in an experiment in 1982.

Oil extract of the gum myrrh Commiphora myrrha has molluscicidal activity against Radix natalensis.

Phylogeny 
A cladogram shows the phylogenic relations of species in the genus Radix:

Synonyms
 Limnaea (Biformiana) cameroni Bourguignat, 1890 (a junior synonym)
 Limnaea (Biformiana) kynganica Bourguignat, 1890 (a junior synonym)
 Limnaea (Biformiana) zanzibarica Bourguignat, 1890 (a junior synonym)
 Limnaea (Limosiana) alexandrina Bourguignat, 1883 (a junior synonym)
 Limnaea (Limosiana) alexandrina var. gracilis Bourguignat, 1883 (a junior synonym)
 Limnaea (Raffrayana) raffrayi Bourguignat, 1883
 Limnaea (Stagnaliana) caillaudi Bourguignat, 1883 (a junior synonym)
 Limnaea acroxa Bourguignat, 1883 (a junior synonym)
 Limnaea aethiopica Bourguignat, 1883 (a junior synonym)
 Limnaea africana Bourguignat, 1883
 Limnaea africana var. azaouadensis Germain, 1909 (a junior synonym)
 Limnaea africana var. elata Germain, 1919 (a junior synonym)
 Limnaea africana var. gouidimouniensis Germain, 1916 (basionym)
 Limnaea africana var. kambaensis Germain, 1911 (a junior synonym)
 Limnaea africana var. kouloaensis Germain, 1911 (a junior synonym)
 Limnaea anceyana Preston, 1910 (a junior synonym)
 Limnaea arabica E. A. Smith, 1894
 Limnaea benguellensis Morelet, 1867 (original combination)
 Limnaea bocageana Morelet, 1867 (a junior synonym)
 Limnaea caillaudi Bourguignat, 1883(a junior synonym)
 Limnaea chudeaui Germain, 1907 (a junior synonym)
 Limnaea damarana O. Boettger, 1910 (junior subjective synonym)
 Limnaea debaizei Bourguignat, 1887 (a junior synonym)
 Limnaea electa E. A. Smith, 1882 (a junior synonym)
 Limnaea elmeteitensis E.A. Smith, 1894 (a junior synonym)
 Limnaea gravieri Bourguignat, 1885
 Limnaea hovarum Tristram, 1863 (a junior synonym)
 Limnaea humerosa E. von Martens, 1897 (a junior synonym)
 Limnaea jouberti Bourguignat, 1888 (a junior synonym)
 Limnaea kempi Preston, 1912 (junior synonym)
 Limnaea laurenti Bourguignat, 1888 (a junior synonym)
 Limnaea lavigeriana Bourguignat, 1888 (a junior synonym)
 Limnaea natalensis F. Krauss, 1848 (superseded combination)
 Limnaea nyansae E. von Martens, 1892 (a junior synonym)
 Limnaea orophila Morelet, 1864 (junior synonym)
 Limnaea suarezensis Dautzenberg, 1895 (a junior synonym)
 Limnaea undussumae E. von Martens, 1897 (a junior synonym)
 Limnaea undussumae var. courteti Germain, 1904 (a junior synonym)
 Limnaea vignoni Germain, 1909 (a junior synonym)
 Limnaeus auricularius var. ribeirensis Reibisch, 1865 (a junior synonym)
 Limnaeus benguellensis Morelet, 1867 (a junior synonym)
 Limnaeus bocageanus Morelet, 1867 (a junior synonym)
 Limnaeus dakaensis Sturany, 1898
 Limnaea perrieri Bourguignat, 1881
 Limnaea raffrayi Bourguignat, 1883
 Lymnaea vatonnei Bourguignat, 1868
 Lymnaea (Radix) natalensis
 Limnaeus natalensis Krauss, 1848
 Limnaeus natalensis var. exsertus von Martens, 1866 (junior synonym)

References
This article incorporates CC-BY-3.0 text from the reference.

External links 

 
  See pages 110, 111–114, 568.

Lymnaeidae
Gastropods described in 1848
Taxa named by Christian Ferdinand Friedrich Krauss